B. Anjanappa was an Indian politician. He was a Member of Parliament, representing Nellore in the Lok Sabha, the lower house of India's Parliament, as a member of the Indian National Congress.

References

External links
Official biographical sketch in Parliament of India website

Lok Sabha members from Andhra Pradesh
Indian National Congress politicians
1918 births
Year of death missing
India MPs 1962–1967
India MPs 1957–1962
Indian National Congress politicians from Andhra Pradesh